Brnjak (nicknamed by local residents Brnjaci or Brnjake) is a village in northern Kosovo. A border crossing with Serbia is located in the village.

Geography 
The settlement is located on the territory of the cadastral municipality of Brnjak with an area of 2,981 ha. Once one of the largest villages in Ibarski Kolašin, it is located in the Brnjačka river basin, which flows from the slopes of Mokra Gora.

History 
During World War II, Brnjak was among the villages in North Kosovo that was burned down by Albanian paramilitaries working with the Sandžak Muslim militia and the Serb population expelled.

2008 North Kosovo incident 
Brnjak was the location of one of the NATO-staffed border checkpoints between Serbia and Kosovo. In February 2008, the border was sealed by NATO troops after ethnic Serbs ransacked and set fire to the border checkpoints at Jarinje and Brnjak.

References

Villages in Zubin Potok